Nelsão, also known as Estádio Nélson Peixoto Feijó is a multi-use stadium located in Maceió, Brazil. It is used mostly for football matches and hosts the home matches of Sport Club Corinthians Alagoano. The stadium has a maximum capacity of 10,000 people.

External links
Templos do Futebol

Football venues in Alagoas
Maceió
Sports venues in Alagoas